The Gdynia Film Festival (until 2011: Polish Film Festival, Polish: Festiwal Polskich Filmów Fabularnych w Gdyni) is an annual film festival first held in Gdańsk (1974–1986), now held in Gdynia, Poland.

It has taken place every year since 1974, except in 1982 and 1983 when Poland was under martial law.

The organizers of the festival are the Ministry of Culture and National Heritage of Poland, Polish Film Institute (PISF), Polish Filmmakers Association, the Pomeranian Voivodeship Local Government as well as the port city of Gdynia.

The Polish Film Festival award is the Grand Prix Golden Lions (Polish: Złote Lwy), which is different from the  Eagle (Polish: Orzeł), awarded at the Polish Film Awards and the Seattle Polish Film Festival (Seattle is the sister city of Gdynia). Special awards include the Platinum Lions (Platynowe Lwy) conferred for lifetime achievements in cinema as well as the Audience Award. Krzysztof Kieślowski and Agnieszka Holland are so far the only film directors to have been awarded the Grand Prix three times. In 2020, Mariusz Wilczyński's Kill It and Leave This Town became the first ever animated film in the festival's history to be awarded the Golden Lions for Best Film.

The jury for the 2008 competition was headed by Robert Gliński, a director who had previously won at the festival.

List of winners 
The Golden Lions Award was not awarded on six occasions: in 1976, four films were instead awarded Main Prizes (Polish: Nagroda Główna), the films which received this distinction were Jerzy Łomnicki's Ocalić miasto, Marek Piwowski's Przepraszam, czy tu biją?, Andrzej Wajda's Smuga cienia and Mieczysław Waśkowski's Hazardziści; in 1982 and 1983, the festival was not held due to the imposition of the martial law in Poland; in 1989, 1991 and 1996.

Gallery

See also
Polish cinema
List of film festivals

References

External links
 Gdynia Film Festival – Official website 
 Gdynia Film Festival at the IMDb

Film festivals in Poland
Gdynia
Polish awards
Recurring events established in 1974